Hagiyama ware (萩山焼) refers to a type of Japanese pottery that was originally produced in Nagoya, central Japan. 

A dedicated Raku ware kiln was built in a garden on the north side of Nagoya Castle. The kiln is thought to have opened after the retirement of the 10th lord of the domain, Tokugawa Naritomo, in 1827. The 12th lord, Tokugawa Naritaka (1810–1845), actively operated the kiln and had it produce tea utensils. Since he also invited Hōraku ware and Sasashima ware potters, there are many similarities in the types of vessels, clay and glaze. 

Another pottery that was produced under the reign of the 12th lord was Kinjō Higashiyama ware.

See also  
Other pottery from Nagoya and the wider Owari region:

 Kawana ware
 Tokoname ware
 Inuyama ware

References

External links 

Culture in Nagoya
History of Nagoya
Japanese pottery
Nagoya Castle